Alejandra de la Guerra (born February 14, 1968) is a former Peruvian volleyball player, who won the silver medal with the Women's National Team at the 1988 Summer Olympics in Seoul, South Korea.

References
 
 

1968 births
Living people
Olympic volleyball players of Peru
Volleyball players at the 1988 Summer Olympics
Olympic silver medalists for Peru
Place of birth missing (living people)
Peruvian women's volleyball players
Olympic medalists in volleyball
Medalists at the 1988 Summer Olympics
Pan American Games medalists in volleyball
Pan American Games silver medalists for Peru
Medalists at the 1987 Pan American Games
20th-century Peruvian women